Sekatap (also known as Skatap) is a settlement in the Betong division of Sarawak, Malaysia.

Neighbouring settlements include:

References

Populated places in Sarawak